The sooty tern (Onychoprion fuscatus) is a seabird in the family Laridae. It is a bird of the tropical oceans, returning to land only to breed on islands throughout the equatorial zone.

Taxonomy 
The sooty tern was described by Carl Linnaeus in 1766 as Sterna fuscata, bearing this name for many years until the genus Sterna was split up. It is now known as Onychoprion fuscatus. The specific fuscatus is Latin for "dark".

Colloquially, it is known as the wideawake tern or just wideawake. This refers to the incessant calls produced by a colony of these birds, as does the Hawaiian name ʻewa ʻewa which roughly means "cacophony". In most of Polynesia its name is manutara or similar – literally "tern-bird", though it might be better rendered in English as "the tern" or "common tern". This refers to the fact that wherever Polynesian seafarers went on their long voyages, they usually would find these birds in astounding numbers. It is also known as kaveka in the Marquesas Islands, where dishes using its eggs are a delicacy.

The sooty tern has little interspecific variation, but it can be divided into at least two allopatric subspecies. Some recent authors further subdivide the Indopacific population into up to eight subspecies altogether, but much of the variation is really clinal. The affinities of eastern Pacific birds (including the famous manutara of Easter Island) are most strongly contested.

Onychoprion fuscatus fuscatus (Linnaeus, 1766) – Atlantic sooty tern
Underparts white. Breeds Atlantic and Caribbean.

Onychoprion fuscatus nubilosus (Sparrman, 1788) – Indopacific sooty tern
Underparts light grey in fresh plumage, dull white in worn plumage. Breeds from Red Sea across Indian Ocean to at least central Pacific. Some authors restrict this taxon to the Indian Ocean population and use the following subspecies for the birds from Indonesia to the Americas:
 Onychoprion fuscatus infuscatus – Sunda sooty tern (Lichtenstein, 1823) – Sunda Islands and vicinity
 Onychoprion fuscatus oahuensis – Central Pacific sooty tern (Bloxam, 1826) – Bonin Islands through Micronesia to southern Polynesia
 Onychoprion fuscatus serrata – Melanesian sooty tern (Wagler, 1830) – Australia, New Guinea, New Caledonia
 Onychoprion fuscatus luctuosa – Juan Fernández sooty tern (Philippi & Landbeck, 1866) – Juan Fernández Islands
 Onychoprion fuscatus crissalis – East Pacific sooty tern Lawrence, 1872.  – Eastern Pacific from Guadalupe Island to Galápagos Islands
 Onychoprion fuscatus kermadeci – Kermadec sooty tern Mathews, 1916.  – Kermadec Islands
 Onychoprion fuscatus somaliensis – Somali sooty tern – Maydh Island (Gulf of Aden)

Description 

The wings and deeply forked tail are long, and it has dark black upperparts and white underparts. It has black legs and bill. The average life span is 32 years. Juvenile sooty terns are scaly grey above and below. The sooty tern is unlikely to be confused with any tern apart from the similarly dark-backed but smaller bridled tern (O. anaethetus). It is darker-backed than that species, and has a broader white forehead and no pale neck collar.

Ecology 

Sooty terns breed in colonies on rocky or coral islands. It nests in a ground scrape or hole and lays a single egg, typically in the afternoon. Although "two-egg clutches" have been reported, they probably occur when an egg from one nest rolls into another. It feeds by picking fish from the surface in marine environments, often in large flocks, and rarely comes to land except to breed, and can stay out to sea for 3 to 10 years. Due to the lack of oil in its feathers, it cannot float, and spends that entire time on the wing.

This bird is migratory and dispersive, wintering more widely through the tropical oceans. It has very marine habits compared to most terns; sooty terns are generally found inland only after severe storms. The Field Museum, for example, has a male specimen which was found exhausted on August 2, 1933 on the slopes of Mount Cameroon above Buea, about  ASL, after foul weather had hit the Gulf of Guinea. This species is a rare vagrant to western Europe, although a bird was present at Cemlyn Bay, Wales for 11 days in July 2005.

It is also not normally found on the Pacific coasts of the Americas due to its pelagic habits. At Baja California, where several nesting locations are offshore, it can be seen more frequently, whereas for example only two individuals have ever been recorded on the coast of El Salvador - one ring recovered in 1972, and a bird photographed on October 10, 2001 at Lake Olomega which was probably blown there by a storm. Hurricanes can also devastate small breeding colonies, as has been surmised for example for the sooty tern nesting sites on cays off the San Andrés Islands of Colombia.

An exceptionally common bird, the sooty tern is not considered threatened by the IUCN.

Role in Easter Island culture 
On Easter Island, this species and the spectacled tern (O. lunatus) are collectively known as manutara. The manutara played an important role in the tangata manu ("birdman") ritual: whichever hopu (champion) could retrieve the first manutara egg from Motu Nui islet would become that year's tangata manu; his clan would receive prime access to resources, especially seabird eggs.

Gallery

Footnotes

References 
 Boulton, Rudyerd & Rand, A.L. (1952): A collection of birds from Mount Cameroon. Fieldiana Zoology 34 (5): 35–64. Fulltext at the Internet Archive
 
 
 
 
 Olsen, Klaus Malling & Larsson, Hans (1995): Terns of Europe and North America. Christopher Helm, London. 
 Pukui, Mary Kawena; Elbert, Samuel Hoyt; Mookini, Esther T. & Nishizawa, Yu Mapuana (1992): New Pocket Hawaiian Dictionary with a Concise Grammars and Given Names in Hawaiian. University of Hawaii Press, Honolulu. 
 Streets, Thomas H. (1877): Some Account of the Natural History of the Fanning Group of Islands. Am. Nat. 11 (2): 65–72. First page image
 Tregear, Edward (1891): Maori-Polynesian Comparative Dictionary. Lyon and Blair, Wellington.

External links

 Sooty tern article at BirdNote.org
 Sooty terns on Ascension Island South Atlantic

sooty tern
sooty tern
Birds of Ascension Island
Birds of Hawaii
Birds of the Atlantic Ocean
Birds of the Dominican Republic
Birds of the Indian Ocean
Birds of the Pacific Ocean
Pantropical fauna
Least concern biota of Asia
Least concern biota of Oceania
Birds of Norfolk Island
sooty tern
sooty tern